Malamel is a village in Pathanapuram Taluk in Kollam district, Kerala, India. This village is situated between Anchal and Valakom by-pass road. In Malayalam language Malamel means, "Top of the hill".

Rock Temples
At Malamel, there is a huge rock on which there is a famous Shiva Temple. Temple festival is held on 3 December. The temple has 5 doors and is considered to be divine and ancient because of the close proximity of Jadayupara (Chadayamangalam) (the rock that Jadayu carried on his wings).  It has also a cave at extreme left of the temple, into which a British Adventurer in the year 1946, tried in vain to venture, and which leads to the Kulathupuzha Forest.  This cave is believed to be a haven for very venomous snakes.
Famous temples like Arackal Devi Temple and Perumannur Devi Temple are nearby.  Kottarakara Sree Mahaganapathy Kshethram is 12 km away.

Kottarakara and Punalur are the towns nearest to the village.

References

External links
 Malamel Shiva Kshethram (Temple) at Google Maps

Villages in Kollam district